The 2018 Women's Junior South American Volleyball Championship was the 24th edition of the tournament, organised by South America's governing volleyball body, the Confederación Sudamericana de Voleibol (CSV). The top two teams qualified for the 2019 Junior World Championship.

Competing nations
The following national teams participated in the tournament, teams were seeded according to how they finished in the previous edition of the tournament:

First round
All times are Peruvian Standard Time (UTC−05:00)

Pool A

Pool B

Final round

5th to 8th places bracket

Championship bracket

Classification 5 to 8

Semifinals

7th place match

5th place match

Bronze Medal match

Gold Medal match

Final standing

Individual awards

Most Valuable Player

Best Opposite

Best Outside Hitters

Best Middle Blockers

Best Setter

Best Libero

References

External links
CSV official website

Women's South American Volleyball Championships
S
Volleyball
International volleyball competitions hosted by Peru
Youth volleyball